The Kansas City Royals' 2008 season began with the team searching for its 15th manager in franchise history. Trey Hillman, former minor league baseball and Hokkaido Nippon Ham Fighters (Nippon Professional Baseball) manager, was hired as the team's skipper on October 19, 2007.

The team looked to improve upon its record of 69–93 from 2007. The team's payroll for the 2008 season was initially estimated to be around $57 million, and wound up at $58 million (24th in the major leagues).

Despite another last-place finish in 2007, the Royals sought a breakout season in 2008. Renovations to Kauffman Stadium were ongoing throughout the 2008 season and it was completed in time for Opening Day in 2009.

Following the team's 81st game, the mid-way point of the 2008 season, the Royals had a 37–44 record. The closest the team managed to crawl back to a .500 record after their 9–6 start to the season was within 6 games in mid-July. After compiling a 7–20 record in August, the Royals were eliminated from recording their first winning season since 2003. However, an 18–8 record in September let the Royals finish with a 75–87 record, their best since 2003.

Offseason

Coaching search

Buddy Bell announced his resignation at the end of the 2007 season after serving two and half seasons with the Royals. Early candidates to assume the manager's position included Royals bench coach Billy Doran, former Royals star Frank White, and Triple-A Omaha manager Mike Jirschele. Former Major League managers such as Joe Girardi, Jim Fregosi, Ken Macha, and Jimy Williams were also in consideration. Trey Hillman, who was considered a sleeper candidate, was chosen on October 19. Hillman was interviewed in 2007 by Texas, San Diego and Oakland. He was mentioned as a possible successor to Joe Torre with New York. Hillman had never played, coached or managed in Major League Baseball prior to his hiring by the Royals.

Winter meetings

The Royals entered baseball's winter meetings in December 2007 with José Guillén and Andruw Jones atop their free-agent prospects list. Torii Hunter was also considered by Kansas City before signing with the Los Angeles Angels of Anaheim. The Royals signed Guillén to a three-year, $36 million contract, while Jones signed with the Los Angeles Dodgers.

The acquisition of Guillén was the Royals' only major move at the winter meetings. Just before the meetings, the Royals had ministered to another need by signing reliever Yasuhiko Yabuta to a two-year deal with an option for 2010. Yabuta, from the Nippon Professional Baseball league, was seen as the likely successor to David Riske in a right-handed setup role. Riske left the Royals for a three-year, $13 million contract with the Milwaukee Brewers. Hiroki Kuroda was on the Royals' radar, but several other teams were in pursuit as well, and the Dodgers signed him first.

In the Rule 5 draft, the Royals picked up left-handed pitcher Ray Liotta from the Chicago White Sox.

Roster moves

Kansas City avoided arbitration with all of its players for the 2008 season.

 C John Buck
 1B Ross Gload
 IF Estéban Germán
 IF Jason Smith (released)
 OF Mark Teahen
 OF Emil Brown (released)
 LHP Jorge de la Rosa
 RHP Zack Greinke
 LHP Jimmy Gobble
 RHP Brandon Duckworth
 RHP Román Colón
 RHP Luke Hudson

(x) = club option for 2008
(m) = mutual option for 2008
(y) = player option for 2008

Color Code Key

Trades
December 15—Traded RHP Billy Buckner to the Arizona Diamondbacks for IF Alberto Callaspo.

Return of the Powder Blues
After a lengthy absence, the Royals' powder blue uniforms returned in 2008. The new powder blue jerseys were unveiled to season-ticket holders on December 6, 2007, at a private event in downtown Kansas City. Royals players John Buck, Mark Teahen, Alex Gordon, José Guillén and David DeJesus and manager Trey Hillman modeled the new power blue tops and white pants, which will be an alternate home jersey in 2008. The Royals previously wore powder-blue uniforms in away games from 1973 to 1991.

The Royals debuted the jerseys on April 12 against the Minnesota Twins. The first 20,000 fans for the game received a replica powder blue No. 16 Billy Butler jersey. With that promotion, the game was a sellout. Manager Trey Hillman and seven players—Brian Bannister, Gil Meche, Joey Gathright, Tony Peña Jr., John Bale, Zack Greinke and Butler—helped hand out the free jerseys when the gates opened at 4 p.m. All 20,000 powder blue tops were handed out within 40 minutes after the gates opened.

Regular season

Suspensions 
Outfielder José Guillén was to be suspended for 15 days (12 games) for violation of Major League Baseball's Drug Prevention and Treatment Program. Kansas City signed Guillén knowing that he might have been suspended. Guillén was cited in the Mitchell Report when it was released on December 13, 2007. Guillén's suspension was put on hold for 10 days allowing him to play in the team's season and home openers. The suspension was eventually upheld and Guillén never received any punishment.

Miguel Olivo faced a five-game suspension for fighting at New York in the 2007 season while a member of the Florida Marlins, but the suspension was reduced to four games after an appeal. He was eligible to begin playing on April 5 against the Minnesota Twins.

Monthly summaries

March and April

On March 31, the Detroit Tigers hosted the Royals on Opening Day. Kansas City listed only 24 players on their active roster, as Miguel Olivo began serving his four-game suspension. The roster listed 11 pitchers, 7 infielders, 4 outfielders, and 2 catchers. Gil Meche made his second consecutive Opening Day start for the Royals, lasting six innings. The Royals won the game 5-4 in 11 innings, and went on to sweep the Tigers in the three-game series outscoring them 13-5. Kansas City hosted the New York Yankees for their home-opening series at Kauffman Stadium and won two of three games. Their 6–2 start was the franchise's best since 2003.

The Royals hosted the Twins from April 11–13, where game-time temperatures reached as low as 29 °F for the series. After losing the first two games and not scoring any runs, the Royals won the last game by a score of 5-1. Kansas City debuted their new alternate powder blue home jerseys to a sold-out crowd on April 12, with a replica jersey giveaway promotion. Brian Bannister threw a complete game and allowed only three hits on April 13 in a 5-1 win. The following night, Zack Greinke threw a complete game as well.

It was not until their 19th game of the season that the Royals fell under a .500 winning percentage in the middle of a seven-game losing streak after going 9–6 to start the season. When the streak was snapped they were 10–13. In 2007, the Royals lost their second game of the year and remained under .500 for the remainder of the season, finishing with a record of 69–93.

May

At the Royals' May 9 game against the Baltimore Orioles, Kansas City-native David Cook threw out the ceremonial first pitch and sang "Take Me Out to the Ballgame" in the seventh inning stretch. At the time, Cook was a finalist on American Idol, and he eventually won the competition.

Brian Bannister threw a two-hitter on May 11 in a 4-0 win over Baltimore for the Royals' first victory over the Orioles after losing 12 consecutive games to the franchise. Through 40 games, Joakim Soria had a 0.00 ERA and ten saves, and the Royals signed him to a three-year contract extension through the 2011 season.

In early May, Kansas City completed their second series sweep against Detroit, advancing to 6-0 over the Tigers on the season. Jon Lester of the Boston Red Sox threw a no-hitter against Kansas City on May 19. It was just the Royals' second game to register no hits against an opponent, and the first since May 15, 1973.

The Royals endured a 12-game losing streak following the loss to Lester and the Red Sox, sending them 11 games under .500 and in last place of the American League Central. The Royals started their May 31 game against Cleveland with the fewest runs, sacrifice flies, RBIs and walks in the major leagues, but beat reigning Cy Young Award winner CC Sabathia 4-2 to end their losing streak.

The losing streak prompted José Guillén to criticize his team's performance with the media after a 9-8 loss to Minnesota:

The Royals' losing streak was the longest in the majors since Kansas City and Pittsburgh both had 13-game losing streaks in 2006. While going almost two weeks without a win, Kansas City had allowed three grand slams, lost a five-run lead in the ninth inning of one game and scored three or fewer runs in nine others. It was the Royals' fourth time losing 12 consecutive games in franchise history, and all of the streaks have occurred since 1997. The losing caused Kansas City to make roster changes by sending the struggling Billy Butler to Triple-A affiliate Omaha. Mike Avilés was called up in exchange.

June

Looking to rebound from their 12-game losing streak in May, the Royals started the month of June with 4 consecutive series wins over National League opponents. Kansas City completed its first ever series sweep of the Cardinals in St. Louis. In 12 years of Interleague play, the Cardinals still hold the I-70 Series lead, 26-22, but the Royals have done better in St. Louis, winning 11 of 21 games. On June 22, the Royals made an improbable comeback after trailing 6-0 and later 10-3 against the San Francisco Giants. The Royals scored 8 unanswered runs and won the game and Joakim Soria recorded his 20th save of the season in 21 tries. Following a sweep of the defending National League champion Colorado Rockies, the Royals boasted an MLB-best 12–3 record in Interleague play and won for the tenth time in 11 games. Following their 12-game skid ended in May, the Royals went 15–9, closed to within seven games of .500 and skipped out of last place of the American League Central.

José Guillén made controversial remarks about Royals fans following booing in the June 25 game against the Rockies which prompted him to apologize days later to the Royals fanbase and team management. Fans booed Guillén in the eighth inning of the Royals' 4-2 win. He grounded to Colorado Rockies third baseman Garrett Atkins and began a slow run toward first base. Atkins' throw was off target, forcing Todd Helton to leave the bag. If Guillén had been at full speed, he might have been safe. Guillén had been battling several injuries which had caused him to play easier in order to avoid the disabled list.

After defeating the Cardinals at Kauffman Stadium, the Royals boasted a six-game winning-streak, the team's best since their 9-0 start in the 2003 season. Billy Butler rejoined the team after Alberto Callaspo was involved in a drunk driving incident.

At the Royals' home game against the Cardinals, the team inducted Art Stewart into the Royals Hall of Fame. Stewart became the first scout to be inducted into any of Major League Baseball's franchise hall of fames, and the Royals' 23rd overall inductee.

In the final game of the month, the Royals defeated the Baltimore Orioles after Miguel Olivo, on a 0-2 pitch, hit a game-tying home run into the left-field seats in the bottom of the 9th inning. José Guillén batted in the Royals' game-winning run and Joakim Soria closed out the game for his 22nd save. The Royals finished out the month of June with a 16–11 record.

July

Joakim Soria was selected to be the Royals' lone representative in the 2008 Major League Baseball All-Star Game, and José Guillén was named to the All-Star Final Vote ballot. Guillén was involved in a heated argument with pitching coach Bob McClure before the team's July 5 game against the Tampa Bay Rays, but was not penalized for his actions.

At the All-Star break, the Royals boasted a record of 43–53, an improvement compared to their 38–50 record from 2007 and 31–56 record in 2006.

On July 21, the Royals suffered their worst defeat of the season, and the Tigers registered their first victory over Kansas City in 2008 with a score of 19-4. By the seventh inning, it was 9-0 in favor of Detroit. The Tigers' 10-run eighth inning mostly came against Jimmy Gobble, who was charged with all 10 runs. At one point in the inning, Gobble allowed six straight hits, the last being a home run by Gary Sheffield. His ERA spiraled from 7.99 to 11.31. Gobble faced 12 hitters in the inning before Hillman finally called for Leo Núñez to substitute. The Royals, behind 19-0, finally broke through with four runs in their half of the eighth. They had five straight hits, including Billy Butler's two-run single. Manager Trey Hillman said following the game:

Hillman decided to enlist shortstop Tony Peña Jr. to pitch the ninth inning for the Royals. Peña, who lost his starting shortstop job to Mike Avilés, pitched a one-two-three inning and registered 90 mph-plus on the radar gun. This was his first competitive pitching since high school in the Dominican Republic. Peña was the first position player pressed into pitching service by the Royals since July 17, 1998, when infielder Shane Halter took a turn in an 18-5 loss at Seattle.

On July 29, ESPN Deportes reported that José Guillén expressed his wish to be traded due to a bad relationship with manager Trey Hillman. When Guillén signed with Kansas City he knew the team wouldn't be a contender in 2008, but he was promised that moves would be made to build a winning team in 2009. Kansas City had not shown any interest in trading Guillén. The source said Guillén was ready to defer his salary for 2009 and 2010 if it were to help increase his value on the trading block. A "visibly upset" Guillén met with Hillman and denied the report. The trade deadline passed on July 31 and the Royals made no trades.

August
The Royals recorded a season-high 19 runs against the Chicago White Sox on August 2 in a 9-7 win. The following day, Kansas City closed out the series against Chicago by winning 14-3. In two days, the Royals recorded 38 total hits for the first time in franchise history. The Royals finally fought back against the White Sox—who have dominated the Royals in years past—both literally and figuratively. Four players and both teams' managers were ejected from the game after confrontations over wild pitches.

The Royals and White Sox played again in mid-August and on August 14 Kansas City allowed four consecutive home runs in the sixth inning to White Sox batters, tying the MLB record. Joel Peralta gave up the first three and Robinson Tejeda allowed the last home run after a pitching change.

José Guillén had to be restrained from a heckling fan during the fourth inning of a 2-1 loss to the Texas Rangers on August 26. Royals third base coach Luis Silverio and others restrained Guillén, while security escorted to a new seat in Kauffman Stadium. Guillén met with Royals general manager Dayton Moore to discuss Guillén's public outburst, his fourth of the season. Royals manager Trey Hillman did not see the incident take place. "I was actually in the toilet, so I didn't see it", Hillman said. "Managers do have to use the restroom and I guess I picked a bad time to be in the restroom. I found out about it a half inning later. We talked about it briefly. There's no sense on commenting on it."

Through 114 games, the Royals were just 7 games under .500, but winning only 7 out of 27 games in the month of August effectively assured Kansas City of another losing season.

September

Going into September, it seemed that the Royals' 7–20 record in August had doomed them to a last-place finish in the American League Central, but the team's best September since the 1977 season helped erase the losing record in the previous month. The Royals took control of fourth place in the division with another three-game sweep of Detroit.

The Royals tied their win total from the 2007 season (69) with a victory over the Seattle Mariners on September 18. The victory was the team's seventh consecutive victory.

In their final series of the season, the Twins hosted the Royals. The Twins hold a ½ game lead in the American League Central over the White Sox, and the Royals won two of three games, leading to a one-game playoff between the Twins and White Sox.

The Royals finished the season with a 75–87 record, their best since 2003 thanks to an 18–8 mark in September.

Season standings

Record vs. opponents

Roster

Game log

|- align="center" bgcolor="#bbffbb"
| 1 || March 31 || @ Tigers || 5 – 4 (11) || Núñez (1-0) || Bautista (0-1) || Soria (1) || 44,934 || 1-0
|-

|- bgcolor="#bbffbb"
| 2 || April 2 || @ Tigers || 4 – 0 ||Bannister (1-0) ||Rogers (0-1) || ||32,348 || 2-0
|- bgcolor="#bbffbb"
| 3 || April 3 || @ Tigers || 4 – 1 ||Greinke (1-0) || Bonderman (0-1) || Soria (2) || 32,735 || 3-0
|- bgcolor="ffbbbb"
| 4 || April 4 || @ Twins || 4 – 3 || Baker (1-0) || Bale (0-1) || Nathan (2) || 21,847 || 3-1
|- bgcolor="ffbbbb"
| 5 || April 5 || @ Twins || 6 – 4 || Hernández (2-0) || Meche (0-1) || Nathan (3) || 21,262 || 3-2
|- bgcolor="#bbffbb"
| 6 || April 6 || @ Twins || 3 – 1 || Tomko (1-0) || Bonser (0-2) || Soria (3) || 21,765 || 4-2
|- bgcolor="#bbffbb"
| 7 || April 8 || Yankees || 5 – 2 || Bannister (2-0) || Hughes (0-1) || Soria (4) || 37,296 || 5-2
|- bgcolor="#bbffbb"
| 8 || April 9 || Yankees || 4 – 0 || Greinke (2-0) || Farnsworth (0-1) || Gobble (1) || 19,007 || 6-2
|-  bgcolor="ffbbbb"
| 9 || April 10 || Yankees || 6 – 1 || Pettitte (1-1) || Bale (0-2) || || 16,143 || 6-3
|- bgcolor="ffbbbb"
| 10 || April 11 || Twins || 5 – 0 || Hernández (3-0) || Meche (0-2) || || 16,691 || 6-4
|- bgcolor="ffbbbb"
| 11 || April 12 || Twins || 2 – 0 || Bonser (1-2) || Tomko (1-1) || Nathan (4) || 36,300 || 6-5
|- bgcolor="#bbffbb"
| 12 || April 13 || Twins || 5 – 1 || Bannister (3-0) || Liriano (0-1) || || 13,886 || 7-5
|- bgcolor="#bbffbb"
| 13 || April 14 || @ Mariners || 5 – 1 || Greinke (3-0) || Washburn (1-2) || || 16,751 || 8-5
|- bgcolor="ffbbbb"
| 14 || April 15 || @ Mariners || 11 – 6 || Batista (1-2) || Bale (0-3) || || 17,137 || 8-6
|- bgcolor="#bbffbb"
| 15 || April 16 || @ Angels || 3 – 2 || Meche (1-2) || Weaver (1-3) || Soria (5) || 41,336 || 9-6
|- bgcolor="ffbbbb"
| 16 || April 17 || @ Angels || 5 – 3 || Garland (2-2) || Tomko (1-2) || Rodríguez (6) || 40,021 || 9-7
|- bgcolor="ffbbbb"
| 17 || April 18 || @ Athletics || 13 – 2 || Gaudin (1-1) || Bannister (3-1) || || 12,528 || 9-8
|- bgcolor="ffbbbb"
| 18 || April 19 || @ Athletics || 6 – 5 || Devine (2-0) || Peralta (0-1) || Street (5) || 20,390 || 9-9
|- bgcolor="ffbbbb"
| 19 || April 20 || @ Athletics || 7 – 1 || Eveland (2-1) || Hochevar (0-1) || || 18,645 || 9-10
|- bgcolor="ffbbbb"
| 20 || April 22 || Indians || 15 – 1 || Sabathia (1-3) || Meche (1-3) || || 16,165 || 9-11
|- bgcolor=#bbbbbb
| N/A || April 23 || Indians ||colspan=6|Postponed (rain) Rescheduled for April 24
|- bgcolor="ffbbbb"
| 21 || rowspan="2" |April 24 || rowspan="2" |Indians(doubleheader) || 9 – 6 || Carmona (3-1) || Tomko (1-3) || Betancourt (1) || rowspan="2"|11,637 || 9-12
|- bgcolor="ffbbbb"
| 22 || 2 – 0 || Lee (4-0) || Bannister (3-2) || || 9-13
|- bgcolor="#bbffbb"
| 23 || April 25 || Blue Jays || 8 – 4 || Núñez (2-0) || Burnett (2-2) || || 22,561 || 10-13
|- bgcolor="#bbffbb"
| 24 || April 26 || Blue Jays || 2 – 1 || Hochevar (1-1) || Marcum (2-2) || Soria (6) || 24,078 || 11-13
|- bgcolor="ffbbbb"
| 25 || April 27 || Blue Jays || 5 – 2 || Litsch (3-1) || Meche (1-4) || Carlson (1) || 13,998 || 11-14
|- bgcolor="#bbffbb"
| 26 || April 29 || @ Rangers || 9 – 5 || Mahay (1-0) || Jennings (0-5) || || 16,472 || 12-14
|- bgcolor="ffbbbb"
| 27 || April 30 || @ Rangers || 11 – 9 || Millwood (2-2) ||  Bannister (3-2) || || 17,705 || 12-15
|-

|- bgcolor="ffbbbb" 
| 28 || May 1 || @ Rangers || 2 – 1 || Ponson (1-0) || Greinke (3-1) || Wilson (6) || 14,563 || 12-16
|- bgcolor="#bbbbbb"
| N/A || May 2 || @ Indians || colspan=6|Postponed (rain) Rescheduled for September 13
|- bgcolor="#bbffbb"
| 29 || May 3 || @ Indians || 4 – 2 || Hochevar (2-1) || Sabathia (1-5) || Soria (7) || 27,272 || 13-16
|- bgcolor="#bbffbb" 
| 30 || May 4 || @ Indians || 2 – 0 || Meche (2-4) || Laffey (0-2) || Soria (8) || 27,836 || 14-16
|- bgcolor="ffbbbb" 
| 31 || May 5 || Angels || 4 – 0 || Santana (6-0) || R. Ramírez (0-1) || || 12,157 || 14-17
|- bgcolor="ffbbbb" 
| 32 || May 6 || Angels || 5 – 3 || Oliver (2-1) || Bannister (3-4) || Rodríguez (14) || 11,354 || 14-18
|- bgcolor="#bbffbb" 
| 33 || May 7 || Angels || 9 – 4 || Greinke (4-1) || Weaver (2-5) || || 11,084 || 15-18
|- bgcolor="ffbbbb"
| 34 || May 8 || Orioles || 4 – 1 || Cabrera (3-1) || Hochevar (2-2) || || 11,781 || 15-19
|- bgcolor="ffbbbb"
| 35 || May 9 || Orioles || 7 – 4 || Trachsel (2-4) || Meche (2-4) || Sherrill (12) || 21,873 || 15-20
|- bgcolor="ffbbbb"
| 36 || May 10 || Orioles || 6 – 5 || Olson (1-0) || Tomko (1-4) || Sherrill (13) || 15,808 || 15-21
|- bgcolor="#bbffbb" 
| 37 || May 11 || Orioles || 4 – 0 || Bannister (4-4) || Burres (3-4) || || 18,635 || 16-21
|- bgcolor="#bbffbb" 
| 38 || May 13 || Tigers ||  3 – 2 || Núñez (3-0) || Cruceta (0-1) || Soria (9) || 11,703 || 17-21
|- bgcolor="bbffbb"
| 39 || May 14 || Tigers || 2 – 0 || Hochevar (3-2) || Verlander (1-7) || Soria (10) || 14,053 || 18-21
|- bgcolor="bbffbb"
| 40 || May 15 || Tigers || 8 – 4 || Meche (3-5) || Rogers (3-4) || || 34,734 || 19-21
|- bgcolor="bbffbb"
| 41 || May 16 || @ Marlins || 7 – 6 || Tomko (2-4) || Miller (3-3) || Soria (11) || 14,825 || 20-21
|- bgcolor="ffbbbb"
| 42 || May 17 || @ Marlins || 7 – 3|| Kensing (3-0) || Bannister (4-5) || || 16,214 || 20-22
|- bgcolor="bbffbb"
| 43 || May 18 || @ Marlins || 9 – 3 || Greinke (5-1) || Badenhop (1-3) || || 10,617 || 21-22
|- bgcolor="ffbbbb"
| 44 || May 19 || @ Red Sox || 7 – 0 || Lester (3-2) || Hochevar (3-3) || || 37,746 || 21-23
|- bgcolor="ffbbbb"
| 45 || May 20 || @ Red Sox || 2 – 1 || Masterson (1-0) || Meche (3-6) || Papelbon (13) || 37,486 || 21-24
|- bgcolor="ffbbbb"
| 46 || May 21 || @ Red Sox || 6 – 3 || Colón (1-0) || Tomko (2-5) || || 37,674 || 21-25
|- bgcolor="ffbbbb"
| 47 || May 22 || @ Red Sox || 11 – 8 || Matsuzaka (8–0) || Bannister (4–6) || Papelbon (14) || 37,613 || 21-26
|- bgcolor="ffbbbb"
| 48 || May 23 || @ Blue Jays || 7 – 1 || Halladay (5-5) || Greinke (5-2) || || 24,207 || 21-27
|- bgcolor="ffbbbb"
| 49 || May 24 || @ Blue Jays || 6 – 0 || Litsch (6-1) || Hochevar (3-4) || || 28,162 || 21-28
|- bgcolor="ffbbbb"
| 50 || May 25 || @ Blue Jays || 3 – 1 || McGowan (3-4) || Meche (3-7) || Ryan (11) || 29,315 || 21-29
|- bgcolor="ffbbbb"
| 51 || May 26 || @ Blue Jays || 7 – 2 || Marcum (5-3) || Tomko (2-6) || || 23,157 || 21-30
|- bgcolor="ffbbbb"
| 52 || May 27 || Twins || 4 – 3 (12) || Crain (2-2) || Núñez (3-1) || Guerrier (1) || 17,191 || 21-31
|- bgcolor="ffbbbb"
| 53 || May 28 || Twins || 9 – 8 (10) || Crain (3-2) || Peralta (0-2) || Nathan (14) || 13,621 || 21-32
|- bgcolor="ffbbbb"
| 54 || May 29 || Twins || 5 – 1 || Slowey (2-4) || Hochevar (3-5) || || 12,336 || 21-33
|- bgcolor="ffbbbb"
| 55 || May 30 || Indians || 5 – 4 || Lee (8-1) || Tomko (2-7) || Borowski (4) || 25,243 || 21-34
|- bgcolor="bbffbb"
| 56 || May 31 || Indians || 4 – 2 || Davies (1-0) || Sabathia (3-7) || Soria (12) || 23,923 || 22-34
|-

|- bgcolor="bbffbb"
| 57 || June 1 || Indians || 6 – 1 || Bannister (5-6) || Byrd (2-5) || || 22,345 || 23-34
|- bgcolor="ffbbbb"
| 58 || June 3 || @ White Sox || 9 – 5 || Floyd (6-3) || Greinke (5-3) || || 21,727 || 23-35
|- bgcolor="ffbbbb"
| 59 || June 4 || @ White Sox || 6 – 4 (15) || Dotel (3-2) || Gobble (0-1) || || 23,515 || 23-36
|- bgcolor="ffbbbb"
| 60 || June 5 || @ White Sox || 6 – 2 || Contreras (6-3) || Meche (3-8) || || 25,104 || 23-37
|- bgcolor="bbffbb"
| 61 || June 6 || @ Yankees ||  2 – 1 || Davies (2-0) || Rasner (3-3) || Soria (13) || 52,187 || 24-37
|- bgcolor="ffbbbb"
| 62 || June 7 || @ Yankees || 12 – 11 || Rivera (2-1) || Soria (0-1)|| || 53,611 || 24-38
|- bgcolor="ffbbbb"
| 63 || June 8 || @ Yankees || 6 – 3 || Giese (1-1) || Greinke (5-4) ||  Rivera (16) || 54,213 || 24-39
|- bgcolor="#bbffbb" 
| 64 || June 9 || @ Yankees || 3 – 2 || Yabuta (1-0) || Rivera (2-2) || Soria (14) || 53,633 || 25-39
|- bgcolor="ffbbbb"
| 65 || June 10 || Rangers || 6 – 5 || Guardado (1-1) || Yabuta (1-1) || Wilson (12) || 14,741 || 25-40
|- bgcolor="ffbbbb"
| 66 || June 11 || Rangers || 11 – 5 || Padilla (8-3) || Gobble (0-2) || || 20,840 || 25-41
|- bgcolor="bbffbb"
| 67 || June 12 || Rangers || 6 – 5 || Mahay (2-0) || Francisco (1-2) || Soria (15) || 15,515 || 26-41
|- bgcolor="ffbbbb"
| 68 || June 13 || @ Diamondbacks || 1 – 0 (10) || Buckner (1-0) || Yabuta (1-2) || || 33,323 || 26-42
|- bgcolor="bbffbb"
| 69 || June 14 || @ Diamondbacks || 12 – 3 || Hochevar (4-5) || Johnson (4-4) || || 44,615 || 27-42
|- bgcolor="bbffbb"
| 70 || June 15 || @ Diamondbacks || 8 – 3 || Meche (4-8) || Owings (6-5) || || 39,125 || 28-42
|- bgcolor="bbffbb"
| 71 || June 17 || @ Cardinals || 2 – 1 || Davies (3-0) || Villone (1-2) || Soria (16) || 43,793 || 29-42
|- bgcolor="bbffbb"
| 72 || June 18 || @ Cardinals || 3 – 2 || Bannister (6-6) || McClellan (0-2) || Soria (17) || 43,810 || 30-42
|- bgcolor="bbffbb"
| 73 || June 19 || @ Cardinals || 4 – 1 || Greinke (6-4) || Thompson (1-2) || Soria (18) || 44,277 || 31-42
|- bgcolor="ffbbbb"
| 74 || June 20 || Giants || 9 – 4 || Cain (4-5) || Yabuta (1-3) || || 34,588 || 31-43
|- bgcolor="bbffbb"
| 75 || June 21 || Giants || 5 – 3 || Meche (5-8) || Correia (1-5) || Soria (19) || 28,903 || 32-43
|- bgcolor="bbffbb"
| 76 || June 22 || Giants || 11 – 10 || Mahay (3-0) || Hinshaw (1-1) || Soria (20) || 20,499 || 33-43
|- bgcolor="bbffbb"
| 77 || June 23 || Rockies || 8 – 4 || Bannister (7-6) || Francis (3-7) || || 12,260 || 34-43
|- bgcolor="bbffbb"
| 78 || June 24 || Rockies || 7 – 3 || Greinke (7-4) || de la Rosa (2-4) || || 19,169 || 35-43
|- bgcolor="bbffbb"
| 79 || June 25 || Rockies || 4 – 2 || Hochevar (5-5) || Cook (10-5) || Soria (21) || 16,615 || 36-43
|- bgcolor="bbffbb"
| 80 || June 27 || Cardinals || 7 – 2 || Meche (6-8) || Piñeiro (2-4) || || 36,360 || 37-43
|- bgcolor="ffbbbb"
| 81 || June 28 || Cardinals || 5 – 1 || Boggs (3-0) || Davies (3-1) || || 37,537 || 37-44
|- bgcolor="ffbbbb"
| 82 || June 29 || Cardinals || 9 – 6 || Pérez (2-0) || Bannister (7-7) || Franklin (11) || 31,803 || 37-45
|- bgcolor="bbffbb"
| 83 || June 30 || @ Orioles || 6 – 5 (11) || Mahay (4-0) || Bradford (3-3) || Soria (22) || 15,289 || 38-45
|-

|- bgcolor="ffbbbb"
| 84 || July 1 || @ Orioles || 7 – 5 || Liz (3-0) || Hochevar (5-6) || Sherrill (27) || 19,756 || 38-46
|- bgcolor="ffbbbb"
| 85 || July 2 || @ Orioles || 5 – 2 || Cabrera (6-4) || Meche (6-9) || || 17,909 || 38-47
|- bgcolor="bbffbb"
| 86 || July 3 || @ Orioles || 10 – 7 || Peralta (1-2) || Loewen (0-2) || Soria (23) || 16,782 || 39-47
|- bgcolor="ffbbbb"
| 87 || July 4 || @ Rays || 11 – 2 || Jackson (5-6) || Bannister (7-8) ||  || 16,830 || 39-48
|- bgcolor="ffbbbb"
| 88 || July 5 || @ Rays || 3 – 0 || Sonnanstine (10-3) || Greinke (7-5) || Balfour (3) || 30,418 || 39-49
|- bgcolor="ffbbbb"
| 89 || July 6 || @ Rays || 9 – 2 || Shields (7-5) || Hochevar (6-5) ||  || 20,587 || 39-50
|- bgcolor="bbffbb"
| 90 || July 7 || @ Rays || 7 – 4 || Soria (1-1) ||Wheeler (2-4) || || 16,293 || 40-50
|- bgcolor="ffbbbb"
| 91 || July 8 || White Sox || 8 – 7 (13) || Masset (1-0) || Tejeda (0-1) || || 13,614 || 40-51
|- bgcolor="ffbbbb"
| 92 || July 9 || White Sox || 7-6 || Russell (3-0) || Tejeda (0-2) || Dotel (1) || 16,502 || 40-52
|- bgcolor="bbffbb"
| 93 || July 10 || White Sox || 4 – 1 || Mahay (5-0) || Buehrle (6-8) || Soria (24) || 14,547 || 41-52
|- bgcolor="bbffbb"
| 94 || July 11 || Mariners || 3 – 1 || Hochevar (6-7) || Hernández (6-6) || Soria (25) || 25,345 || 42-52
|- bgcolor="bbffbb"
| 95 || July 12 || Mariners || 5 – 4 || H. Ramírez (1-0) || Morrow (1-2) || || 23,792 || 43-52
|- bgcolor="ffbbbb"
| 96 || July 13 || Mariners || 4 – 3 || Green (2-2) || Soria (1-2) || Morrow (9) || 21,421 || 43-53
|- bgcolor="ffbbbb"
| 97 || July 18 || @ White Sox || 9 – 5 || Buehrle (7-8) || Greinke (7-6) || || 36,291 || 43-54
|- bgcolor="bbffbb"
| 98 || July 19 || @ White Sox || 9 – 1 || Meche (7-9) || Floyd (10-6) || || 36,566 || 44-54
|- bgcolor="bbffbb"
| 99 || July 20 || @ White Sox || 8 – 7 || R. Ramírez (1-1) || Thornton (4-2) || Soria (26) || 32,269 || 45-54
|- bgcolor="ffbbbb"
| 100 || July 21 || Tigers || 19 – 4 || Miner (4-3) || Hochevar (6-8) || || 14,137 || 45-55
|- bgcolor="ffbbbb"
| 101 || July 22 || Tigers || 7 – 1 || Rogers (8-6) || Davies (3-2) || || 22,074 || 45-56
|- bgcolor="ffbbbb"
| 102 || July 23 || Tigers || 7 – 1 || Galarraga (8-4) || Greinke (7-7) || || 16,594 || 45-57
|- bgcolor="bbffbb"
| 103 || July 24 || Rays || 4 – 2 || Meche (8-9) || Garza (8-6) || Soria (27) || 25,900 || 46-57
|- bgcolor="ffbbbb"
| 104 || July 25 || Rays || 5 – 3 || Jackson (6-7) || Bannister (7-9) || Percival (21) || 31,535 || 46-58
|- bgcolor="ffbbbb"
| 105 || July 26 || Rays || 5 – 3 || Reyes (2-2) || H. Ramírez (1-1) || Percival (22) || 24,322 || 46-59
|- bgcolor="bbffbb"
| 106 || July 27 || Rays || 6 – 1 || Davies (4-2) || Sonnanstine (10-6) || || 13,779 || 47-59
|- bgcolor="bbffbb"
| 107 || July 28 || @ Athletics || 4 – 2 || Greinke (8-7) || Braden (2-1) || Soria (28) || 12,464 || 48-59
|- bgcolor="bbffbb"
| 108 || July 29 || @ Athletics || 5 – 2 || Meche (9-9) || Smith (5-10) || Soria (29) || 12,182 || 49-59
|- bgcolor="bbffbb"
| 109 || July 30 || @ Athletics || 4 – 3 (10) || R. Ramírez (2-1) || Street (2-4) || Soria (30) || 26,272 || 50-59
|-

|- bgcolor="ffbbbb"
| 110 || August 1 || White Sox || 4 – 2 || Vázquez (8-9) || Hochevar (6-9) || Jenks (22) || 21,291 || 50-60
|- bgcolor="bbffbb"
| 111 || August 2 || White Sox || 9 – 7 || Davies (5-2) || Buehrle (8-10) || Soria (31) || 21,866 || 51-60
|- bgcolor="bbffbb"
| 112 || August 3 || White Sox || 14 – 3 || Greinke (9-7) || Richard (0-2) || || 15,268 || 52-60
|- bgcolor="bbffbb"
| 113 || August 4 || Red Sox || 4 – 3 || Meche (10-9) || Buchholz (2-7) || Soria (32) || 24,378 || 53-60
|- bgcolor="ffbbbb"
| 114 || August 5 || Red Sox || 8 – 2 || Beckett (10-8) || Bannister (7-10) || || 22,069 || 53-61
|- bgcolor="ffbbbb"
| 115 || August 6 || Red Sox || 8 – 2 || Wakefield (7-8) || Hochevar (6-10) || || 24,294 || 53-62
|- bgcolor="ffbbbb"
| 116 || August 8 || Twins || 4 – 1 || Slowey (8-8) || Davies (5-3) || Nathan (31) || 33,653 || 53-63
|- bgcolor="ffbbbb"
| 117 || August 9 || Twins || 7 – 3 || Liriano (2-3) || Greinke (9-8) || || 27,960 || 53-64
|- bgcolor="bbffbb"
| 118 || August 10 || Twins || 5 – 4 (12) || Tejeda (1-2) || Breslow (0-1) || || 27,960 || 54-64
|- bgcolor="ffbbbb"
| 119 || August 12 || @ White Sox || 9 – 0 || Vázquez (9-10) || Bannister (7-11) || || 31,099 || 54-65
|- bgcolor="ffbbbb"
| 120 || August 13 || @ White Sox || 4 – 0 || Buehrle (10-10) || Hochevar (6-11) || || 37,838 || 54-66
|- bgcolor="ffbbbb"
| 121 || August 14 || @ White Sox || 9 – 2 || Broadway (1-0) || Davies (5-4) || || 32,788 || 54-67
|- bgcolor="bbffbb"
| 122 || August 15 || @ Yankees || 4 – 3 || Núñez (4-1) || Rivera (4-5) || Soria (33) || 53,067 || 55-67
|- bgcolor="ffbbbb"
| 123 || August 16 || @ Yankees || 3 – 2 (13) || Robertson (3-0) || Fulchino (0-1) || || 54,180 || 55-68
|- bgcolor="ffbbbb"
| 124 || August 17 || @ Yankees || 15 – 6 || Mussina (16-7) || Bannister (7-12) || || 54,114 || 55-69
|- bgcolor="ffbbbb"
| 125 || August 19 || @ Indians || 9 – 4 || Reyes (2-1) || Hochevar (6-12) || || 18,946 || 55-70
|- bgcolor="ffbbbb"
| 126 || August 20 || @ Indians || 8 – 5 || Rincón (3-3) || Soria (1-3) || Lewis (4) || 23,920 || 55-71
|- bgcolor="ffbbbb"
| 127 || August 21 || @ Indians || 10 – 3 || Lee (18-2) || Greinke (9-9) || || 21,391 || 55-72
|- bgcolor="ffbbbb"
| 128 || August 22 || Tigers || 4 – 3 || Verlander (10-13) || Bannister (7-13) || Rodney (6) || 18,361 || 55-73
|- bgcolor="ffbbbb"
| 129 || August 23 || Tigers || 4 – 0 || Miner (7-4) || Davies (5-5) || || 27,346 || 55-74
|- bgcolor="bbffbb"
| 130 || August 24 || Tigers || 7 – 3 || Duckworth (1-0) || Rogers (9-11) || || 16,663 || 56-74
|- bgcolor="ffbbbb"
| 131 || August 25 || Rangers || 9 – 4 || Feldman (5-5) || Meche (10-10) || || 12,399 || 56-75
|- bgcolor="ffbbbb"
| 132 || August 26 || Rangers || 2 – 1 || Millwood (8-7) || R. Ramírez (2-2) || || 17,004 || 56-76
|- bgcolor="ffbbbb"
| 133 || August 27 || Rangers || 3 – 2 || Harrison (6-3) || Bannister (7-14) || Francisco (1) || 12,662 || 56-77
|- bgcolor="ffbbbb"
| 134 || August 29 || @ Tigers || 6 – 3 || Miner (8-4) || Davies (5-6) || || 40,206 || 56-78
|- bgcolor="bbffbb"
| 135 || August 30 || @ Tigers || 13 – 3 || Duckworth (2-0) || Rogers (9-12) || || 40,623 || 57-78
|- bgcolor="ffbbbb"
| 136 || August 31 || @ Tigers || 4 – 2 || Glover (2-3) || Wells (0-1) || Rodney (7) || 39,782 || 57-79
|-

|- bgcolor="bbffbb"
| 137 || September 2 || Athletics || 5 – 2 || Greinke (10-9) || Gonzalez (1-3) || Soria (34) || 11,143 || 58-79
|- bgcolor="bbbbbb"
| N/A || September 3 || Athletics ||colspan=6|Postponed (rain) Rescheduled for September 4
|- bgcolor="bbffbb"
| 138 || rowspan="2" |September 4 || rowspan="2" | Athletics(doubleheader) || 5 – 4 (10) || Soria (2-3) || Devine (4-1) || || rowspan="2"| 12,791 || 59-79
|-bgcolor="bbffbb"
| 139 || 9 – 6 || Davies (6-6) || Meyer (0-4) || R. Ramírez (1) || 60-79
|- bgcolor="ffbbbb"
| 140 || September 5 || Indians || 9 – 3 || Mujica (2-1) || Duckworth (2-1) || || 21,107 || 60-80
|- bgcolor="bbffbb"
| 141 || September 6 || Indians || 3 – 1 || Meche (11-10) || Jackson (0-2) || Soria (35) || 18,795 || 61-80
|- bgcolor="ffbbbb"
| 142 || September 7 || Indians || 3 – 1 || Lee (21-2) || Greinke (10-10) || Lewis (8) || 15,023 || 61-81
|- bgcolor="ffbbbb"
| 143 || September 9 || @ Twins || 7 – 2 || Blackburn (10-8) || Bannister (7-15) || || 17,015 || 61-82
|- bgcolor="ffbbbb"
| 144 || September 10 || @ Twins || 7 – 1 || Slowey (12-9) || Davies (6-7) || || 20,421 || 61-83
|- bgcolor="bbffbb"
| 145 || September 11 || @ Twins || 3 – 2 (10) || R. Ramírez (3-2) || Guerrier (6-8) || Soria (36) || 20,138 || 62-83
|- bgcolor="ffbbbb"
| 146 || September 12 || @ Indians || 12 – 5 || Lee (22-2) || Meche (11-11) || || 32,843 || 62-84
|- bgcolor="bbffbb"
| 147 || rowspan="2" |September 13 || rowspan="2" | @ Indians(doubleheader) || 8 – 3 || Greinke (11-10) || Carmona (8-7) || || rowspan="2"| 25,783 || 63-84
|- bgcolor="bbffbb"
| 148 || 8 – 4 || Tejeda (2-2) || Bullington (0-1) || Soria (37) || 64-84
|- bgcolor="bbffbb"
| 149 || September 14 || @ Indians || 13 – 3 || Bannister (8-15) || Mujica (2-2) || || 29,530 || 65-84
|- bgcolor="bbffbb"
| 150 || September 15 || Mariners || 3 – 0 || Davies (7-7) || Silva (4-15) || Soria (38) || 10,307 || 66-84
|- bgcolor="bbffbb"
| 151 || September 16 || Mariners || 6 – 3 || Duckworth (3-1) || Morrow (2-4) || Soria (39) || 19,135 || 67-84
|- bgcolor="bbffbb"
| 152 || September 17 || Mariners || 5 – 2 || Meche (12-11) || Corcoran (5-2) || Soria (40) || 13,382 || 68-84
|- bgcolor="bbffbb"
| 153 || September 18 || Mariners || 12 – 0 || Greinke (12-10) || Feierabend (1-4) || || 14,144 || 69-84
|- bgcolor="ffbbbb"
| 154 || September 19 || White Sox || 9 – 4 || Buehrle (14-11) || Bannister (8-14) || || 26,049 || 69-85
|- bgcolor="bbffbb"
| 155 || September 20 || White Sox || 5 – 2 || Davies (8-7) || Floyd (16-8) || Soria (40) || 23,754 || 70-85
|- bgcolor="ffbbbb"
| 156 || September 21 || White Sox || 3 – 0 || Danks (11-8) || Duckworth (3-2) || Jenks (29) || 16,920 || 70-86
|- bgcolor="bbffbb"
| 157 || September 22 || Tigers || 6 – 2 || Meche (13-11) || Miner (8-5) || || 36,428 || 71-86
|- bgcolor="bbffbb"
| 158 || September 23 || Tigers || 5 – 0 || Greinke (13-10) || García (1-1) ||  || 35,121 || 72-86
|- bgcolor="bbffbb"
| 159 || September 24 || Tigers || 10 – 4 || Bannister (9-16) || Robertson (7-11) || || 35,899 || 73-86
|- bgcolor="bbffbb"
| 160 || September 26 || @ Twins || 8 – 1 || Davies (9-7) || Liriano (6-4) || || 30,674 || 74-86
|- bgcolor="bbffbb"
| 161 || September 27 || @ Twins || 4 – 2 || Meche (14-11) || Guerrier (6-9) || Soria (42) || 38,072 || 75-86
|- bgcolor="ffbbbb"
| 162 || September 28 || @ Twins || 6 – 0 || Baker (11-5) || Duckworth (3-3) || || 42,942 || 75-87
|-

Player stats

Batting
Note: G = Games played; AB = At bats; R = Runs scored; H = Hits; 2B = Doubles; 3B = Triples; HR = Home runs; RBI = Runs batted in; AVG = Batting average; SB = Stolen bases

Pitching
Note: W = Wins; L = Losses; ERA = Earned run average; G = Games pitched; GS = Games started; SV = Saves; IP = Innings pitched; R = Runs allowed; ER = Earned runs allowed; BB = Walks allowed; K = Strikeouts

Awards and honors

Player of the Week 
April 7–13: Brian Bannister, shared with Raúl Ibañez (Seattle Mariners).
May 12–18: José Guillén.
July 28 – August 3: Mike Avilés, shared with Xavier Nady (New York Yankees).

Farm system 

LEAGUE CHAMPIONS: Burlington (Midwest)

References

External links

2008 Kansas City Royals at Baseball Reference

Kansas City Royals seasons
Kansas City Royals season
Kansas